WKRX (96.7 FM) is a radio station broadcasting a Country format. Licensed to Roxboro, North Carolina, United States.  The station is currently owned by Roxboro Broadcasting Company.

Programming includes local news, Person County High School sports, Orange County Speedway races, and bluegrass and beach music. The station also airs NASCAR racing and is affiliated with MRN and PRN.

References

External links

KRX